Locus Castorum was an ancient village of the Roman Empire era located in northern Italy approximately  from Cremona, and midway between Cremona and Bedriacum. Its name derives from the Gemini twins, of Castor and Pollux. It was the site of the Battle of Locus Castorum.

References

Roman towns and cities in Italy